Statistics of American Soccer League II in season 1952–53.

League standings

New England Division

References

American Soccer League (1933–1983) seasons
American Soccer League, 1952-53